Apache Forrest is a web-publishing framework based on Apache Cocoon. It is an XML single source publishing framework that allows multiple types of data-files as input, such as various popular word processing and spreadsheet files, as well as two wiki dialects.  Plugins are available to support additional formats, both for input as well as output (such as PDF).

Forrest was retired in February, 2020.

Forrest is not a content management system (CMS), as it lacks the full workflow and admin functions of a CMS. Its primary use is in integrating and aggregating content from various sources and presenting them in a unified format for human consumption. "Single source" is this context does not mean that it is restricted to aggregating from only a single source, but rather that the multiple output formats can be maintained whilst still only needing to maintain a single source document.

Trivia
While Apache Forrest has  not seen a new release for 6 years and was started in 2002, the website still claims "Apache Forrest is fairly new".

See also
 Apache Software Foundation
 Apache Cocoon
 Apache Lenya

References

External links
 Apache Forrest website
 Itay Verchik

Forrest
Web design
Technical communication tools